Berlengas Natural Reserve is a Portuguese natural reserve in the Berlengas, a small archipelago off the coast of Peniche, Portugal. Over 98% of its  are marine. The symbol of the protected area is the common murre, which has, or had, its southernmost nidifying population in the islands.

References

Nature reserves in Portugal
Centro Region